Flin Flon is a provincial electoral division in the Canadian province of Manitoba.  It was created by redistribution in 1957, and has formally existed since the provincial election of 1958.

At about 80,000 square kilometers, Flin Flon occupies roughly 20% of Manitoba's total area, and is the second largest riding in the province after Rupertsland.  It was a smaller riding before 1989, when it gained a significant amount of territory from the former riding of Churchill.  It is a mostly rural and sparsely populated riding, located in the province's northwestern corner.

Flin Flon is bordered by Saskatchewan to the west, Nunavut to the north, the ridings of Rupertsland and Thompson to the east, and the riding of The Pas to the south.  The actual city of Flin Flon is located in the southwestern corner of the riding, and is its only urban centre.

The riding's population in 1996 was 14,470.  In 1999, the average family income was $55,113, and the unemployment rate was 9.70%.  Manufacturing accounts for 17% of Flin Flon's economy, followed by mining and oil production at 16%.

73.4% of Flin Flon's residents are aboriginal.

Flin Flon has been held by the New Democratic Party of Manitoba (NDP) since 1969.  The current MLA is Tom Lindsey, who was elected in the provincial election of 2016. He replaced the incumbent, Clarence Pettersen who was de-selected by the NDP and decided to contest the election as an Independent.

List of provincial representatives

Electoral results

1958 general election

1959 general election

1962 general election

1966 general election

1969 general election

1973 general election

1977 general election

1981 general election

1986 general election

1988 general election

1990 general election

1995 general election

1999 general election

2003 general election

2007 general election

2011 general election

2016 general election

2019 general election

Previous boundaries

References

Flin Flon
Flin Flon